The Mimbres Valley AVA is an American Viticultural Area located in southwestern New Mexico near the towns of Deming and Silver City. The area is a desert, but irrigation and the deep, rich soils of the once-larger Mimbres River have made viticulture possible since the late 19th century.

See also
New Mexico wine

References 

New Mexico wine
American Viticultural Areas
Geography of Grant County, New Mexico
Geography of Luna County, New Mexico
1985 establishments in New Mexico